Jade Ellenger (born 4 March 2000) is an Australian rules footballer playing for Brisbane in the AFL Women's (AFLW) competition.

Early Life
Ellenger was born in South East London in England. Her parents migrated to Australia when she was 4 settling in Brisbane, Queensland at Redland City. She attended Victoria Point High School playing basketball and athletics. Between the ages of 14 and 18 she excelled in basketball deciding to focus on that sport where she made the state championships with Logan City. She took up Australian rules at the age of 15 when her teacher offered her the day off school to play in a local AFL competition, after her first game she developed a passion for the sport, deciding to switch from basketball to football. 

Ellenger played for Coorparoo in the AFL Queensland Women's League (QWAFL). She played 14 matches during the 2018 season, including the Grand Final, which they lost to Wilston Grange. She represented Queensland in the 2018 AFL Women's Under 18 Championships, playing every game and being named amongst the best in their loss to Vic Country and in their victory over Eastern Allies. Also after being drafted to the AFLW, Ellenger continued playing with Coorparoo in the off-seasons. She helped them win the 2019 premiership, beating Bond University, and was named in the Team of the Year.

AFLW career
Ellenger was recruited by Brisbane as a post-draft rookie compensation selection in 2018, after Brisbane lost many players to expansion clubs Geelong and North Melbourne. She made her AFLW debut in Brisbane's round 6 game against Carlton at Princes Park on 10 March 2019, kicking two goals. In April 2019, Ellenger re-signed with Brisbane for the 2020 season.

Playing style
Ellenger can play as a defender, a half-back, or a midfielder. Despite her smaller size, her playing style is similar to Kate Lutkins.

Personal life
Ellenger has studied paramedic science.

References

External links
 

2000 births
Living people
Sportswomen from Queensland
Australian rules footballers from Queensland
Brisbane Lions (AFLW) players